Augustus Sherrill Seymour (November 30, 1836 – February 19, 1897) was a lawyer, state legislator, and United States district judge of the United States District Court for the Eastern District of North Carolina.

Education and career

Born in Ithaca, New York, Seymour graduated from Hamilton College in 1857 and read law to enter the bar in 1858. He was in private practice in New York City, New York from 1858 to 1862, and then in New Bern, North Carolina beginning in 1865. He became the city attorney of New Bern in 1867. He was a Judge in Craven County, North Carolina in 1868, and was a member of the North Carolina House of Representatives from 1868 to 1870, thereafter resuming private practice in New Bern. He was a member of the North Carolina Senate from 1872 to 1874, and a Judge of the Superior Court in New Bern from 1874 to 1882.

Federal judicial service

On February 14, 1882, Seymour was nominated by President Chester A. Arthur to a seat on the United States District Court for the Eastern District of North Carolina vacated by Judge George Washington Brooks. Seymour was confirmed by the United States Senate on February 21, 1882, and received his commission the same day. He served in that capacity until his death on February 19, 1897, in New York City.

See also
North Carolina General Assembly of 1868–1869

References

Sources
 

1836 births
1897 deaths
Judges of the United States District Court for the Eastern District of North Carolina
United States federal judges appointed by Chester A. Arthur
19th-century American judges
People from New Bern, North Carolina
19th-century American politicians
United States federal judges admitted to the practice of law by reading law